Dragonfly is the first studio album released by Ziggy Marley on April 15, 2003. The track "Rainbow in the Sky" features both Flea and John Frusciante of the Red Hot Chili Peppers, while "Melancholy Mood" features only Flea.

Track listing
All songs written by David Marley.
"Dragonfly" – 4:16 
"True to Myself" – 3:49
"I Get Out" – 4:18
"Looking" – 3:21
"Shalom Salaam" – 5:08
"In the Name of God" – 5:38
"Rainbow in the Sky" – 3:08 (featuring Steve Jordan John Frusciante and Flea)
"Melancholy Mood" – 4:33 (featuring Flea)
"Good Old Days" – 4:18
"Never Deny You" – 4:06
"Don't You Kill Love" – 3:46

Personnel

Mikey Bennett – vocal arrangement
Steve Bigas – additional guitars (tracks 3, 6)
Ron Blake – flugelhorn (track 8), horns (7, 8)
Richard Bravo – percussion (track 1)
Jeff Burns – assistant engineer
Paul Bushnell – bass (tracks 4, 6)
Mike Butler – assistant engineer, mixing
Greg Calbi – mastering
Héctor Castillo – assistant engineer
Patrick Clifford – A&R
Leah Coloff – cello (track 10)
Luis Conte – percussion (tracks 1–4, 6)
Gary Corbett – Rhodes piano (track 5)
Tyrone Downie – synthesizer (track 11), piano (9), keyboards (7)
Steve Ferrone – drums (tracks 10–11)
Flea – bass (tracks 7, 8)
John Frusciante – guitar (track 7)
Neville Garrick – illustrations
Keith Grant – assistant engineer, mixing assistant
James Harrah – additional guitars  (tracks 2, 6)
Ross Hogarth – guitar (track 6), producer (tracks 1–4, 6), engineer, mixing
Rami Jaffee – organ (tracks 2, 4), accordion (4), keyboards (3, 6)
Steve Jordan – drums (tracks 7–9)
Chris Kilmore – scratching (track 7)
Gregor Kitzis – violin (track 10)
Nick Lane – horns (track 2)
David Lindley – guitar (tracks 2–4, 6)
Scott Litt – backing vocals (track 1), producer (5, 7–10), engineer
Eric Lynn – keyboards (track 3)
Brian MacLeod – drums (tracks 2, 3, 6)
Roger Joseph Manning Jr. – piano (track 8)
Cedella Marley – lead vocals (track 9)
Daniel Marley – backing vocals (track 11)
Sharon Marley – backing vocals (tracks 2, 4, 7–10)
Ziggy Marley – vocals (5, 6, Lead: 1–4, 7–11), organ (10), synthesizer (11), bass (5, 10–11), guitar (1-3, 5, 8–11), drums (4), percussion (9-11), piano (10), producer (All tracks), engineer, mixing
Reggie McBride – bass (tracks 2, 3)
Mario J. McNulty – assistant engineer
Martha Mooke – viola (track 10)
Marc Moreau – synthesizer (tracks 8–9, 11), guitar (5, 9, 11), percussion (4, 9), drum machine programming (5), engineer, mixing
Meg Okura  – violin (track 10)
Lon Price – horns (track 2)
David Ralicke – horns (tracks 7, 8), saxophone (4)
Robert Reid – assistant engineer
Angel Roché Jr. – percussion (tracks 7, 8)
Blues Saraceno – additional guitars (tracks 3, 6)
Wes Seidman – assistant engineer
Ivy Skoff – production coordination
Earl "Chinna" Smith – additional guitars (track 11)
Greg "Frosty" Smith – horns (track 2)
Erica Stewart – backing vocals (tracks 2, 4, 7–10)
Lee Thornburg – horns (track 2)
Tony Visconti – string arrangements
Seth Waldman – assistant engineer, mixing assistant
Dan Warner – lead guitar (track 1)
Eric Weaver – assistant engineer
Kevin Westenberg – photography

Chart performance

Album

References

External links
Dragonfly at Ziggy Marley's official website.
 

2003 debut albums
Ziggy Marley albums
Albums arranged by Tony Visconti
Albums produced by Scott Litt
Private Music albums